Central Bedfordshire Council is the local authority for the Central Bedfordshire unitary authority area in the ceremonial county of Bedfordshire, England. It was created from the merger of Mid Bedfordshire and South Bedfordshire District Councils and Bedfordshire County Council on 1 April 2009.

Council's current composition

Administrative history 
The county council of Bedfordshire was abolished on 1 April 2009. The term of office of councillors of Bedfordshire County Council and of Mid Bedfordshire and South Bedfordshire District Councils ended on 1 April 2009. A new unitary council from that date to be known as Central Bedfordshire Council, was created for the same area as the existing districts of Mid and South Bedfordshire. There was to be no county council for the new county.

Elections 

Central Bedfordshire Council is made up of 59 Councillors. 

On 7 October 2020, former UKIP councillor Patrick Hamill became Independent. Similarly, two former Conservative councillors – Nicola Harris and Steven Watkins – became Independent on 29 November and 17 December 2021 respectively.

Leader of the Council  
Richard Wenham was elected as the new Leader of Central Bedfordshire Council at the first Full Council meeting of 2021, on 14 January 2021.
Wenham is the third leader of the unitary authority, which was created in 2009 and he succeeds James Jamieson, who had been Leader since 2011.

Premises
The council inherited offices at Priory House (built 2006) in Chicksands from Mid Bedfordshire District Council, and the South Bedfordshire District Council offices (built 1989) in Dunstable. Priory House acts as the council's headquarters, whilst the former South Bedfordshire offices were renamed Watling House and continue to be used as office space by the council.

References

External links
 Central Bedfordshire Council Website

Unitary authority councils of England
Local education authorities in England
Local authorities in Bedfordshire
Billing authorities in England
Leader and cabinet executives
Central Bedfordshire District